Mario Medda (4 March 1943 – 1981) was an Italian modern pentathlete. He competed at the 1968, 1972 and 1976 Summer Olympics in the individual and team events with the best result of sixth place with the Italian team in 1976.

References

1943 births
1981 deaths
Italian male modern pentathletes
Olympic modern pentathletes of Italy
Modern pentathletes at the 1968 Summer Olympics
Modern pentathletes at the 1972 Summer Olympics
Modern pentathletes at the 1976 Summer Olympics
People from the Province of South Sardinia
Sportspeople from Sardinia
20th-century Italian people